Bean Lake is the name of two lakes in the United States:

Bean Lake (Cottonwood County, Minnesota)
Bean Lake (Missouri)